Parachinar Airport  is an airport located   in Parachinar, FATA, Pakistan. Located at about a 25-minute drive from the center of Parachinar, it is the only airport in FATA that is served by any passenger airline, namely Pakistan International Airlines. Presently (February 2007), the PIA service is temporarily suspended.

The airport was built in the 1980s, following the Russian invasion of Afghanistan, to provide military landing facilities.

Airfield data
Runway 1: Aircraft size max: Airbus A330 
Cargo Facilities: Animal Quarantine

See also
 List of airports in Pakistan
 Airlines of Pakistan
 Transport in Pakistan
 Pakistan Civil Aviation Authority

External links
Parachinar Airport data at Executive Air International Services

References

Airports in Khyber Pakhtunkhwa
Buildings and structures in Khyber Pakhtunkhwa
Kurram District